Robert Neumann may refer to:

Robert G. Neumann (1916–1999), American politician and ambassador
Robert Neumann (footballer) (born 1972), retired Czech football player
Robert Neumann (writer) (1897–1975), German and English-speaking writer.
Robert Neumann (Australian politician), mayor of Gold Coast, Australia
Robert Neumann (badminton), retired German badminton player, played in 1991 IBF World Championships – Men's doubles

See also
Robert Neuman, art historian
Robert Newman (disambiguation)